Prince Opoku Bismark Polley Sampene (born 4 May 1969), known as Prince Polley, is a Ghanaian retired professional footballer who played as a striker.

Career 
He used to play for the Dutch club FC Twente.

International 
Polley participated for Ghana in the 1992 and 1994 African Cup of Nations. Together with Abedi Pele and Anthony Yeboah, he comprised the Black Stars' forward line and scored a combined brace in the 1992 and 1994 competitions. His goals included a crucial match winner against Nigeria in the semi-finals of the 1992 cup, and an 87th minute match winner against Senegal in the group stages, in the subsequent cup.

Personal life
After his playing career, Polley returned to Ghana. He has a son, Robin, who is a professional footballer for Heracles Almelo.

References

External links
Stats on Prince Polley

1969 births
Living people
Ghanaian footballers
Ghana international footballers
Asante Kotoko S.C. players
Sparta Rotterdam players
K. Beerschot V.A.C. players
Beerschot A.C. players
FC Twente players
SC Heerenveen players
Excelsior Rotterdam players
FC Aarau players
Eredivisie players
Eerste Divisie players
Belgian Pro League players
Ghanaian expatriate footballers
Ghanaian expatriate sportspeople in the Netherlands
Expatriate footballers in the Netherlands
Ghanaian expatriate sportspeople in Belgium
Expatriate footballers in Belgium
Ghanaian expatriate sportspeople in Switzerland
Expatriate footballers in Switzerland
1992 African Cup of Nations players
1994 African Cup of Nations players
Association football forwards